Black Sabbath: The Dio Years is a 2007 compilation CD of material recorded by Black Sabbath during vocalist Ronnie James Dio's tenure in the band. The CD contains remastered tracks taken from the studio albums Heaven and Hell (1980), Mob Rules (1981), and Dehumanizer (1992), as well as a live version of the song "Children of the Sea" taken from the live album Live Evil (1982). It also contains three songs that were recorded in 2007: "The Devil Cried", "Shadow of the Wind", and "Ear in the Wall".

It was reported that the collection was first conceived of as a box set, in the vein of Black Box: The Complete Original Black Sabbath (1970–1978), containing all of the group's albums released from their 
Ozzy Osbourne period, starting from Heaven and Hell to The Eternal Idol. This idea was eventually scrapped, and another box set was planned only to feature the four albums recorded from the Dio era of the band. This second idea was put aside, eventually emerging as The Rules of Hell box set released in the summer of 2008.

In an interview conducted by Martin Popoff, Tony Iommi revealed that in fact three tracks were recorded: "Shadow of the Wind" (a slow tune), "The Devil Cried" (a mid-tempo rocker) and "Ear in the Wall" (a fast song), therefore changing the original plan for two new songs to accommodate all three tracks in the compilation. "The Devil Cried" was released as a single on 13 March 2007.

On 23 February 2007, both Eddie Trunk and Sirius Satellite Radio unveiled the song "The Devil Cried" from the upcoming album. Rhino Records subsequently made the track available (for preview only) on 26 February 2007. On the week of 13 March 2007, it became available for download at all digital outlets.

After the recording was completed the members decided to tour under the moniker Heaven & Hell. Dio and Iommi decided that the working partnership they had achieved in recording the 3 new songs would not be wasted, so they recorded The Devil You Know.

UK Tour Edition
Before the Heaven & Hell tour of the UK in November 2007, a special edition release of The Dio Years was released on 5 November, Black Sabbath: The Dio Years Tour Edition, to commemorate the tour. This CD, only to be in print for a limited time, features four songs from the Live at Hammersmith Odeon limited edition live album recently released by Black Sabbath. The four songs, recorded live in 1981 during Black Sabbath's "Mob Rules Tour" are "Neon Knights", "The Mob Rules", "Children of the Grave", and "Voodoo".

Track listing
All songs were written by Ronnie James Dio, Tony Iommi and Geezer Butler, except where noted.

Personnel
Ronnie James Dio – vocals
Tony Iommi – guitar
Geezer Butler – bass
Bill Ward – drums (on tracks 1–5)
Vinny Appice – drums (on tracks 6–16)
Geoff Nicholls – keyboards (on tracks 1–13)
Mike Exeter – engineering and mixing

Charts

Album

Singles

See also

References

Black Sabbath compilation albums
2007 compilation albums
Warner Records compilation albums
Rhino Records compilation albums